Belenois grandidieri is a butterfly in the family Pieridae. It is found on Madagascar and the Seychelles. The habitat consists of forests and forest margins.

References

External links
Seitz, A. Die Gross-Schmetterlinge der Erde 13: Die Afrikanischen Tagfalter. Plate XIII 13

Butterflies described in 1878
Pierini
Butterflies of Africa
Taxa named by Paul Mabille